The 1895 Marshall Thundering Herd football team represented Marshall University in the 1895 college football season. In its inaugural season, the team did not have a coach, and were outscored by their opponents 0–36 in two games.

Marshall would not field a team the following year, returning for the 1897 season.

Schedule

Game summaries

Ashland High School

This game was the first in Marshall school history. The Ashland football team outweighed the Marshall squad by an average of 163 pounds to 135.

Kingsbury High School

Kingsbury High School, from Ironton, Ohio, served as the opponents in Marshall's first ever homecoming football game.

References

Marshall
Marshall Thundering Herd football seasons
College football winless seasons
Marshall Thundering Herd football